Chondrogaster is a genus of truffle-like fungi in the Mesophelliaceae family. The genus, described by French mycologist René Maire in 1926, contains two species, the type Chondrogaster pachysporus, and Chondrogaster angustisporus, described in 2000. Collectively, Chondrogaster is found in Mauritania, Brazil, and Europe.

References

External links
 

Hysterangiales
Truffles (fungi)
Agaricomycetes genera
Taxa named by René Maire